BC Timba Timişoara was a professional basketball club, based in Timișoara, Romania. The club competed in the Liga Națională and Liga I until it was dissolved in the summer of 2018.

History
The club was founded in 2006 and promoted relatively quickly in Liga Națională, but relegated at the end of the 2014–15 season, after finishing 12th. Timba Timişoara promoted back after two years in Liga I. In the summer of 2018 Timba withdrew from the championship and then was dissolved.

2017–2018 roster

References

External links
  
 Timba At Frbaschet.ro
 Timba At Totalbaschet.ro
 Timba At Eurobasket.com
 Timba at BaschetRomania.ro

Sport in Timișoara
Defunct basketball teams in Romania
Basketball teams established in 2006
Basketball teams disestablished in 2018
2006 establishments in Romania
2018 disestablishments in Romania